The Primavera Sound 2017 was held on 29 May to 4 June 2017 at the Parc del Fòrum, Barcelona, Spain.

The headliners were Arcade Fire, Bon Iver, the xx, Aphex Twin, Grace Jones, Slayer, Solange, and Van Morrison. American musician Frank Ocean was set to headline the festival but cancelled due to production delays.

Lineup
Headline performers are listed in boldface. Artists listed from latest to earliest set times.

Heineken

Mango

Primavera

Ray-Ban

Pitchfork

adidas Originals

Auditori Rockdelux

Night Pro

Heineken Hidden Stage

Firestone Stage

Mango House

Primavera a la Ciutat lineup

Sala Apolo

La [2] de Apolo

Barts

Day Pro

Seat

Sala Teatre

Primavera Bits lineup

Bacardí Live

Desperados Club feat. Bowers & Wilkins Sound System

References

2017 music festivals
Music festivals in Spain
Primavera Sound